Jay Artigues (born December 13, 1968) is the current director of athletics for Southeastern Louisiana University. He previously served as head baseball coach at Southeastern Louisiana from 2006 to 2013, prior to his appointment as athletic director. During his eight years as coach of the Lions, he compiled an overall record of 276–188.

Head coaching record

References

External links
 LionSports.net bio

1968 births
Living people
Baseball players from Mississippi
Belhaven Blazers baseball players
Bossier Parish Cavaliers baseball coaches
High school baseball coaches in the United States
New Orleans Privateers baseball coaches
Pearl River Wildcats baseball coaches
Pearl River Wildcats baseball players
People from Bay St. Louis, Mississippi
Southeastern Louisiana Lions baseball coaches
Southeastern Louisiana Lions and Lady Lions athletic directors
Spring Hill Badgers baseball coaches